The Diocese of Derry is a diocese which straddles the international frontier between the Republic of Ireland & Northern Ireland. It is in the ecclesiastical province of Armagh. The diocese was established in the year 1158. The diocese consists of almost fifty parishes and some number of religious congregations have houses in various parts of the diocese.

The Cathedral Church of the diocese is St Eugene's Cathedral. Nearby is St Columba's Church, Long Tower.

Schools in the Diocese
Schools in the diocese include: St Columb's College, Thornhill College, St Joseph's Boys' School, Lumen Christi College.

Adult Faith Development
As part of their adult faith development, the diocese runs the Diploma in Pastoral Theology validated by St. Patrick's College, Maynooth, from the Drumalis Retreat Centre.

The Derry Diocese Catechetical Centre in conjunction with St Mary's University, Twickenham offer a Masters in Catholic School Leadership.

Geography
Derry contains most of County Londonderry, some parishes in counties Tyrone and Antrim and the Inishowen peninsula in County Donegal, and the parish of Lifford (Clonleigh) in East Donegal. As well as the city of Derry, the main towns are Buncrana, Coleraine, Lifford, Limavady, Maghera, Omagh and Strabane.

Bishops

The following is a basic list of the post-Reformation Roman Catholic bishops and vicars apostolic.

See also
Diocese of Derry and Raphoe (Church of Ireland)
Roman Catholicism in Ireland
List of Roman Catholic dioceses in Northern Ireland
Apostolic Nuncio to Ireland

References

External links
 Diocese of Derry – official website

 
Derry
1158 establishments in Ireland
Derry
Religion in County Antrim
Religion in County Donegal
Religion in County Londonderry
Religion in County Tyrone
Roman Catholic Ecclesiastical Province of Armagh